Ikatan may refer to:

Places 

 Ikatan Bay, Alaska, US
 Ikatan Peninsula, Alaska, US
 Ikatan, Alaska, US

In Indonesia 

 Ikatan Akuntan Indonesia, organization
 Ikatan Cendekiawan Muslim Indonesia, organization
 Ikatan Motor Indonesia, automotive
 Ikatan Naturopatis Indonesia, organization
 Ikatan Pandu Indonesia, organization

In Malaysia 

 Parti Ikatan Bangsa Malaysia, political party
 Ikatan Masyarakat Islam Malaysia, political party
 Ikatan Relawan Rakyat Malaysia, paramilitary civil volunteer corps
 Ikatan Siswazah Muslim Malaysia, organization

Acronyms 

IKATAN (Institut Kejuruteraan Teknologi Tenaga Nasional), Universiti Tenaga Nasional